Edmonton Griesbach is a federal electoral district in Alberta.
Edmonton Griesbach was created by the 2012 federal electoral boundaries redistribution and was legally defined in the 2013 representation order. It came into effect upon the call of the 42nd Canadian federal election, scheduled for 19 October 2015. It was created out of parts of the electoral districts of Edmonton East and Edmonton—St. Albert. The riding name refers to Griesbach, Edmonton.

Demographics
According to the Canada 2011 Census; 2013 representation

Ethnic groups: 65.9% White, 9.4% Aboriginal, 6.0% Black, 4.9% Chinese, 3.2% Southeast Asian, 2.7% Arab, 2.3% Filipino, 2.1% Latin American, 1.7% South Asian 
Languages: 71.8% English, 4.1% Chinese, 2.5% Ukrainian, 2.5% French, 2.3% Arabic, 1.8% Vietnamese, 1.7% Spanish, 1.2% Italian, 1.2% Tagalog, 1.1% Portuguese, 1.1% German, 1.0% Polish
Religions: 57.4% Christian (28.2% Catholic, 4.9% United Church, 3.2% Christian Orthodox, 2.7% Anglican, 2.2% Lutheran, 1.4% Pentecostal, 1.3% Baptist, 13.5% Other), 6.9% Muslim, 3.3% Buddhist, 31.0% No religion 
Median income (2010): $29,059 
Average income (2010): $36,696

Members of Parliament

This riding has elected the following members of the House of Commons of Canada:

Election results

References

Alberta federal electoral districts
Politics of Edmonton